Chelmer railway station is located on the Main line in Queensland, Australia. It serves the Brisbane suburb of Chelmer.

History
The original station opened north of its current location in 1876 as Oxley's Point. In 1888, the station was renamed Riverton.  A siding was built at the current Chelmer station location in 1881, which was later converted into the current Chelmer railway station in 1889. Riverton was closed that same year.

The line through Chelmer was duplicated in June 1886. The station was rebuilt in 1959 as part of the quadruplication of the line.

Services
Chelmer is served by City network services operating from Nambour, Caboolture, Kippa-Ring and Bowen Hills to Springfield Central, Ipswich and Rosewood.

Services by Platform

*Note: One weekday morning service (4:56am from Central) and selected afternoon peak services continue through to Rosewood.  At all other times, a change of train is required at Ipswich.

References

External links

Chelmer station Queensland Rail
Chelmer station Queensland's Railways on the Internet

Chelmer, Queensland
Railway stations in Brisbane
Railway stations in Australia opened in 1881
Main Line railway, Queensland